Yitzchak Shmuel Halevi Berkovits is an American-born Orthodox Jewish rabbi, rosh yeshiva, rosh kollel, and posek (arbiter of Jewish law) in Israel. In 16 years as Menahel Ruchani (spiritual director) of Yeshivas Aish HaTorah and halakha (Jewish law) lecturer at EYAHT, Aish HaTorah's College of Jewish Studies for Women, he built a reputation as a lucid orator on Jewish law and philosophical topics and a mentor to hundreds of English-speaking, baalei teshuva young men and women. In 2001, he founded The Jerusalem Kollel, a rabbinic ordination and training program which prepares students for kiruv (outreach) positions around the world. In 2019, he was appointed rosh yeshiva of Yeshivat Aish HaTorah in Jerusalem. He also serves as rosh kollel of an international network of evening kollelim run by Linas HaTzedek: The Center for Jewish Values in Israel and the United States, which spreads the awareness of the laws of bein adam lechaveiro (mitzvot between man and his fellow man).

Berkovits is considered the "unofficial posek" of the kiruv world. He is well-known to international audiences for his telephone tapes and books on shemiras halashon (laws of proper speech) for the Chofetz Chaim Heritage Foundation.

Early life and education
Yitzchak Shmuel Halevi Berkovits is the only son of Aryeh Leib Halevi and Chana Berkowitz, both Holocaust survivors. His ancestors on both his father's and mother's sides were Hasidic, including his paternal great-grandfather, Rabbi Pinchos Zimetbaum, the av beis din (head of the rabbinical court) of Grosswardein, and his great-uncle, Dayan Yitzchok Yaakov Weiss, the Minchas Yitzchak.

Raised in the Boro Park neighborhood of Brooklyn, New York, which had a paucity of Hasidic yeshivas at the time, Berkovits was enrolled at the Lithuanian-oriented Yeshivas Toras Emes-Kaminetz. At the age of 20 he went to Israel to study at the Mir yeshiva in Jerusalem, where he learned under Rabbi Nochum Partzovitz. He spent much time in the home of his illustrious great-uncle, and also made relationships with Jerusalem poskim Rabbi Yosef Shalom Eliashiv and Rabbi Yisroel Yaakov Fisher. He married at age 28.

Career
After ten years at the Mir, in 1983, Berkovits was asked by Rebbetzin Denah Weinberg to teach halakha (Jewish law) in her new seminary, EYAHT, the Aish HaTorah College of Jewish Studies for Women. Weinberg's husband, Rabbi Noah Weinberg, then appointed him as Menahel Ruchani (spiritual director) of Yeshivas Aish HaTorah in the Old City. During his 16 years with Aish HaTorah, Berkovits developed and supervised the yeshiva's rabbinic ordination program, graduating hundreds of students.

In 2001, Berkovits left Aish HaTorah to found The Jerusalem Kollel, a three-year rabbinic ordination and training program which prepares rabbis and kiruv (outreach) counselors to serve communities in the Jewish diaspora. Berkovits is the rosh kollel. Hundreds of his students fill prominent positions around the globe. In the evenings, the kollel turns into a beis midrash (study hall) for advanced avreichim from the Mir and Brisk yeshivas who regard Berkovits as a halakhic authority.

In 2017, Berkovits acquiesced to requests by Aish HaTorah directors to return to the yeshiva and serve as its mara d'asra (halakhic authority). In August 2019, he was named rosh yeshiva, a position that had been vacant since the 2009 death of founding dean Rabbi Noah Weinberg. In 2019, the yeshiva had a student body of more than 600, plus drop-in visitors totaling close to 200,000 annually. Berkovits delivers daily shiurim to all levels and is involved in restructuring the yeshiva's curriculum. He will continue his other responsibilities in addition to his duties at Aish HaTorah.

Other affiliations
In 2001, Berkovits began serving as rosh kollel of the Linas Hatzedek Kollel, an advanced kollel dedicated to the study of the laws of bein adam lechaveiro (mitzvot between man and his fellow man). The students, all full-time avreichim, completed the two-year program and went out to form their own night kollelim on the subject. The kollel, founded and led by Rabbis Paysach Freedman and Tzvi Muller, continued expanding and developed into the Linas HaTzedek: The Center for Jewish Values, which disseminates various study materials on the topic for kollels, schools, synagogues, outreach organizations  and individuals across the world. Berkovits serves as nasi and rosh hakollelim of Linas HaTzedek's international network of kollelim and its other study programs. Additionally, the organization has published nine volumes of Berkovits's writings on the laws of bein adam lechaveiro.

In 2009 Berkovits became the Nasi (president) of UK-based charity Torah Live. He is also the Nasi of the international organisation Jewish Futures, a platform created to unite diverse educational organisations and initiatives, to ensure Jewish futures and Jewish continuity.

Halakhic expertise
Berkovits is a leading authority on the laws of bein adam le'chavero, the Torah's guidelines for interpersonal relationships. He is well known for his expertise in the laws of lashon hara and is the co-author of Chofetz Chaim: A Lesson a Day (2 vol.). He has recorded thousands of taped lectures on a vast range of halakhic and Talmudic topics. He regularly answers she'eilos (halakhic queries) from around the world, addressing issues "from kashrus to geirus to halachic questions arising from alternative lifestyle issues".

Berkovits is the mara d'asra (halakhic authority) of Jerusalem's Sanhedria Murhevet neighborhood, where he resides.

Rent control committee
In 2007, Berkovits founded a rent control committee in the Sanhedria Murhevet neighborhood of Jerusalem in response to price gouging on the part of landlords renting to non-resident Haredi families. Other neighborhoods followed his lead, and this policy was adopted by Rabbi Aharon Leib Shteinman of Bnei Brak and the Belzer Rebbe. This effort has served to maintain reasonable rental prices for foreigners living in Jerusalem.

Bibliography

References

External links
Rabbi Berkovits's writing and recordings
The Jerusalem Kollel
Short Bio & Free MP3 Lectures by Rabbi Yitzchak Berkovits
 Video: "Is Kiruv Really a Chiyuv?" featuring Rabbi Yitzchak Berkovits 
 "The Concept of Guarding Your Tongue" (video) Rabbi Berkovits, March 2018

Rabbis of Aish HaTorah
20th-century rabbis in Jerusalem
21st-century rabbis in Jerusalem
Haredi rabbis in Israel
American emigrants to Israel
Orthodox Jewish outreach
Living people
Levites
Year of birth missing (living people)
Mir Yeshiva alumni